The spinycheek starsnout (Bathyagonus infraspinatus) is a fish in the family Agonidae. It was described by Charles Henry Gilbert in 1904.

It is a marine, temperate water-dwelling fish which is known from the eastern Pacific Ocean, including the coast of the Bering Sea in Alaska, and Eureka, California, USA. It dwells at a depth range of 18–183 metres. Males can reach a maximum total length of 12 centimetres.

References

Spinycheek starsnout
Fish described in 1904
Fish of the Pacific Ocean